Buzdyaksky District (Bashkir and , Büzdäk rayonı) is an administrative and municipal district (raion), one of the fifty-four in the Republic of Bashkortostan, Russia. It is located in the west of the republic and borders with Chekmagushevsky District in the north, Blagovarsky District in the east, Davlekanovsky District in the southeast, Belebeyevsky District in the south, Tuymazinsky District in the southwest and west, and with Sharansky District in the west and northwest. Its administrative center is the rural locality (a selo) of Buzdyak. As of the 2010 Census, the total population of the district was 30,688, with the population of Buzdyak accounting for 33.6% of that number.

History
The district was established on August 20, 1930.

Administrative and municipal status
Within the framework of administrative divisions, Buzdyaksky District is one of the fifty-four in the Republic of Bashkortostan. The district is divided into twelve selsoviets, comprising eighty-two rural localities. As a municipal division, the district is incorporated as Buzdyaksky Municipal District. Its twelve selsoviets are incorporated as twelve rural settlements within the municipal district. The selo of Buzdyak serves as the administrative center of both the administrative and municipal district.

References

Notes

Sources

Districts of Bashkortostan
States and territories established in 1930